AB Aurigae b (or AB Aur b)  is a directly imaged protoplanet embedded within the protoplanetary disk of the young, Herbig AeBe star AB Aurigae. The system is about 508 light-years away: AB Aur b is located at a projected separation of about 93 AU from its host star. AB Aur b is the first confirmed directly imaged exoplanet still embedded in the natal gas and dust from which planets form. It may also provide evidence for the formation of gas giant planets by disk instability.

Discovery
AB Aur b was discovered by a team led by Thayne Currie, Kellen Lawson, and Glenn Schneider using the Subaru Telescope on Mauna Kea, Hawaii and the Hubble Space Telescope (HST). The Subaru data utilized the observatory's extreme adaptive optics system, SCExAO, to correct for atmospheric blurring and the CHARIS integral field spectrograph to record AB Aur b's brightness measurements at different near-infrared wavelengths. AB Aur b's position coincides with the predicted location of a massive protoplanet required to explained CO gas spirals detected with ALMA and lies interior to the ring of pebble-sized dust seen in ALMA continuum data.   The companion was initially detected in 2016: the team initially believed that the signal identified a piece of AB Aurigae's protoplanetary disk, not a newly forming planet.    However, subsequent SCExAO/CHARIS data obtained with Subaru over the next four years showed that AB Aur b's spectrum is dissimilar to that of the protoplanetary disk, with a temperature similar to predicted values for a newly born planet. A new detection with HST using the STIS instrument and an archival detection with the now-decommissioned NICMOS instrument from 2007 confirmed evidence from Subaru data that AB Aur b orbits the star and is not a static feature.

Emission source, morphology, and orbital properties

AB Aur b is detected in near-infrared wavelengths between 1.1 and 2.4 microns with SCExAO/CHARIS, at 1.1 microns with HST/NICMOS, and in unfiltered optical data with HST/STIS. It is also detected in H-alpha with the VAMPIRES instrument behind SCExAO, although it is unclear whether this detection originates from the protoplanet itself or surrounding scattered light. The discovery paper matches the protoplanet's emission using a composite model consisting of a 2000–2500 K thermal component responsible for the CHARIS and NICMOS detections and magnetospheric accretion that also contributes to its detection with STIS.  The CHARIS and NICMOS data are consistent with interpreting AB Aur b as a 9 to 12 Jupiter-mass object with a radius of about 2.75 times that of Jupiter.

The companion appears as a bright, spatially-extended source approximately 0.6 arcseconds (about 93 AU) away from the star, which contrasts with the point source nature of all other directly imaged planets. This morphology is likely due to light from AB Aur b being intercepted and reprocessed by the star's protoplanetary disk. It is not clearly detected in polarized light. Because of its very large distance from the star, AB Aur b's orbit is not well constrained. Modeling thus far suggests that the companion's orbit is inclined about 43 degrees from our line-of-sight, possibly coplanar with the star's protoplanetary disk.

Formation
The canonical model for gas giant planet formation – core accretion – has significant difficulty forming massive gas giant planets at AB Aur b's very large distance from its host star.  Instead, AB Aur b may be forming by disk (gravitational) instability, where as a massive disk around a star cools, gravity causes the disk to rapidly break up into one or more planet-mass fragments.  The numerous spiral arms in AB Aur's protoplanetary disk are consistent with models of planet formation by disk instability.

In popular culture
The system AB Aurigae made a brief appearance in the 2021 film "Don't Look Up" during depicted Subaru observations, although the companion is not visible on the displayed image.

References

Protoplanets
Exoplanets discovered in 2022
Exoplanets detected by direct imaging